The 2006 festival ran from June 15–18.  The headliners for the 2006 festival included Radiohead, Tom Petty & The Heartbreakers, Beck, and Phil Lesh and Friends.  The Preservation Hall Jazz Band was featured in their own tent for three days and nights. 80,000 tickets, sold out. Radiohead's Ed O'Brien has described the band's headlining set as one of their best performances.

Lineup

June 15th
(artists listed from earliest to latest set times)

This Tent:
I-Nine
The Wood Brothers
dios (malos)
Marah
Lucero - List on board at event 2am
That Tent:
The Motet
The Cat Empire
DeVotchKa
Toubab Krewe
The Other Tent:
David Ford
Matt Costa
Tortured Soul
Electric Eel Shock
Sonic Stage:
Nug Jug
Gypsy Hands Tribal Belly Dance
Moonshine Still
The Bonnaroo Comedy Theatre:
Vic Henley, Morgan Murphy, Jon Reep, Tom Papa, Demetri Martin
Patton Oswalt and Jasper Reed (2 sets)
Cinema Tent:
Real Genius
Superman III
Mayor of the Sunset Strip
Walk the Line
2006 NBA Finals Game Four
Star Wars: Episode III – Revenge of the Sith
The Shining
The Street Fighter

June 16th
(artists listed from earliest to latest set times)

What Stage:
Steel Pulse
Oysterhead
Tom Petty and the Heartbreakers
Which Stage:
World Party
Ben Folds
Bright Eyes
Death Cab for Cutie
This Tent:
Robinella
Seu Jorge
Mike Gordon & Ramble Dove
Ricky Skaggs & Kentucky Thunder
Lyrics Born
Common
Blackalicious
That Tent:
Andrew Bird
Devendra Barnhart
Nickel Creek
Cat Power and the Memphis Rhythm Band
My Morning Jacket
The Other Tent:
Bettye LaVette
Donavon Frankenreiter
G. Love & Special Sauce
Robert Randolph & the Family Band
Umphrey's McGee
Disco Biscuits
Sonic Stage:
I-Nine
DeVotchKa
The Wood Brothers featuring John Medeski & Kenny Wollesen
Toubab Krewe
World Party
Umphrey's McGee
Devendra Banhart
Steel Train
The Bonnaroo Comedy Theatre:
Patton Oswalt and Jasper Reed (2 sets)
Vic Henley, Morgan Murphy, Jon Reep, Tom Papa, Demetri Martin (2 sets)
Blue Room Café:
Vorcza
Eliot Morris
American Minor
Troo Music Lounge:
Corn Mo
Tyler Ramsey
Hector Qirko Band
Die Nachtigallen
Bobby Bare Jr.
Samantha Stollenwerck
Hot Buttered Rum
Infradig
Cinema Tent:
Electric Apricot: Quest for Festeroo
Everyone Stares: The Police Inside Out
She's the Man
Madagascar
King Kong
Wetlands Preserved
Superman III
Rosemary's Baby

June 17th
(artists listed from earliest to latest set times)

What Stage:
The Neville Brothers
Elvis Costello & the Imposters featuring Allen Toussaint
Beck
Radiohead
Which Stage:
The Magic Numbers
Buddy Guy
Damian "Jr. Gong" Marley
Cypress Hill
This Tent:
Grace Potter and the Nocturnals
Steel Train
Rusted Root
Blues Traveler
Dr. John
Rebirth Brass Band
Ivan Neville's Dumpstaphunk
That Tent:
Dungen
Clap Your Hands Say Yeah
Gomez
Les Claypool's Fancy Band
The Other Tent:
Jackie Greene
Bill Frisell
Amadou & Mariam
Medeski Martin & Wood
Balkan Beat Box
The Dresden Dolls
Sasha
Sonic Stage:
Tom Hamilton of Brothers Past
Les Claypool
Blues Traveler
Gomez
moe.
Jackie Greene
Buddy Guy
The Disco Biscuits
Dungen
The Bonnaroo Comedy Theatre:
Lewis Black and Kjell Bjorgen (2 Sets)
Blue Room Café:
Grayson Capps
Gran Bel Fisher
Phil Pollard & His Band of Humans
Troo Music Lounge:
Trevor Hall
Mutemath
Zac Brown Band
Artvandalay
Tishamingo
The Avett Brothers
Garage Deluxe
Cinema Tent:
Fan-Submitted Short Movies
USA vs. Italy
Neil Young: Heart of Gold
Eight Legged Freaks
Scarface (Widescreen Anniversary Edition)
Rocky IV
Real Genius
Walk the Line

June 18th
(artists listed from earliest to latest set times)

What Stage:
Col. Bruce Hampton & The Codetalkers
Béla Fleck and the Flecktones
moe.
Phil Lesh and Friends
Which Stage:
Brothers Past
Sierra Leone's Refugee All Stars
Matisyahu
Bonnie Raitt
This Tent:
Mike Doughty's Band
Soulive
The Streets
Atmosphere
That Tent:
Be Your Own Pet
Deadboy & the Elephantmen
Stephen Malkmus and the Jicks
Sonic Youth
The Other Tent:
Shooter Jennings
Jerry Douglas
Son Volt
Steve Earle
Sonic Stage:
Matisyahu
Andrew Bird
Rusted Root
Mike Doughty's Band
Jerry Douglas
Eric Krasno and Reggie Watts of Soulive
Béla Fleck and the Flecktones
The Bonnaroo Comedy Theatre:
Lewis Black and Kjell Bjorgen
Blue Room Café:
JD & The Straight Shot
The Rockwells
Tim Lee Band
Troo Music Lounge:
Abigail Washburn
Leslie Woods
Mitch Rutman Group
Bojones
Cinema Tent:
Before the Music Dies
Press On
Sierra Leone's Refugee All Stars
Star Wars: Episode III – Revenge of the Sith
2006 NBA Finals Game Five

Superjam
(Core band members only, guests not included)

Trey Anastasio (guitar), Mike Gordon (guitar), Phil Lesh (bass), Marco Benevento (organ, keyboards), Joe Russo (drums)

References

Bonnaroo Music Festival by year
2006 in American music
2006 music festivals
2006 in Tennessee
Bonnaroo